Challinor is the name of several people:

Dave Challinor (born 1975), English footballer and manager
David Challinor (1920–2008), American biologist
Frederick Arthur Challinor (1866–1952), English composer
Henry Challinor (1814–1882), physician and politicianin Queensland, Australia
Jack Challinor (1916–1981), English footballer
Jim Challinor (1934–1976), English rugby league player and coach
Joan R. Challinor, American civil servant
Jon Challinor (born 1980), English footballer
Raymond Challinor (1929–2011), English historian